The 1982 Sovran Bank Classic was a men's tennis tournament and was played on outdoor clay courts. The event was part of the 1982 Grand Prix circuit. It was the 14th edition of the tournament and was held at Rock Creek Park in Washington, D.C. from July 19 through July 25, 1982. First-seeded Ivan Lendl won the singles title.

Finals

Singles
 Ivan Lendl defeated  Jimmy Arias 6–3, 6–3
 It was Lendl's 9th singles title of the year and the 26th of his career.

Doubles
 Raúl Ramírez /  Van Winitsky defeated  Hans Gildemeister /  Andrés Gómez 7–5, 7–6

References

External links
 ATP tournament profile
 ITF tournament edition details

Washington Open (tennis)
Sovran Bank Classic
Sovran Bank Classic
Sovran Bank Classic
Sovran Bank Classic